The Lights from the Chemical Plant is the third studio album by Nashville-based singer-songwriter Robert Ellis. It was released in February 2014 under New West Records.

Ellis recorded the album in Eric Masse's East Nashville studio the Casino under the direction of producer Jacquire King. Ellis has said The Lights from the Chemical Plant, inspired by his hometown Lake Jackson, Texas, is more "stylistically ambiguous" than his previous albums incorporating elements of R&B, bossa nova, fusion and free jazz.

On June 30, 2014 NPR Music listed the track "Chemical Plant" as one of the 50 Favorite Songs Of 2014 (So Far) .

Track listing

References

2014 albums
New West Records albums